In finance, the infection ratio describes the relationship between non-performing portfolios and the total loan portfolio. The infection ratio is used to work out the relationship between the non-performing part of the portfolio (i.e., loans not efficiently being recovered) and the total loan portfolio of a bank or other financial entity. The ratio is used to evaluate infection in the loan portfolio between two different time periods, or amongst various organizations, or against an industry standard. The users of this financial management technique are the central banks/regulators, credit rating agencies, and institutions in the business of giving credit lines/loans.

References

Credit risk
Financial ratios